Kay was an Ancient Egyptian official living most likely in the Fifth Dynasty. He is mainly known from his mastaba in Saqqara North. Kay hold a high number of important titles making him the most powerful of his time, only second to the king.  His main office was that of a vizier. Beside being vizier, he was also holding many other important titles, such as Overseer of the treasuries, Overseer of Upper Egypt, overseer of the scribes of the king's document, overseer of the six big houses and overseer of all royal works of the king. His mastaba in Saqqara was recorded by Gaston Maspero who assigned to it the number D 19. Kay was bearing 51 titles, making him the vizier with the highest numbers of titles. Kay was the first Egyptian official with the title overseer of the six big houses. The office became one of the most important  at the royal court in the later Fifth Dynasty and continued to be so during the subsequent Sixth Dynasty .

The dating of Kay is uncertain. No biography is preserved in his tomb, no king's name is mentioned. A date to the middle of the Fifth Dynasty has been proposed. Others prefer a date to the early Fifth Dynasty.

References

Literature 

Viziers of the Fifth Dynasty of Egypt
Overseer of the treasury
Ancient Egyptian overseers of royal works